The House of Dănești was one of the two main lineages of the Wallachian noble family House of Basarab. They were descended from Dan I of Wallachia.
The other lineage of the Basarabs is the House of Drăculești.

Members 
Dan I of Wallachia
Dan II of Wallachia
Vladislav II of Wallachia
Dan III of Wallachia
Basarab II of Wallachia
Basarab III of Wallachia 
Basarab IV of Wallachia
Vladislav III of Wallachia
Moise of Wallachia

References
Nicolae Iorga, Histoire des Roumains : volume IV, Les chevaliers, Bucharest, 1937.